Dubné is a municipality and village in České Budějovice District in the South Bohemian Region of the Czech Republic. It has about 1,700 inhabitants.

Administrative parts
Villages of Jaronice, Křenovice and Třebín are administrative parts of Dubné.

History
The first written mention of Dubné is from 1263, when it is written about a lower nobleman Sudslav of Dubné. The village was held by a lower nobility (of Dubné, Roubíkové of Hlavatce, Dubenští of Chlum, Ojířové of Protivec) until the end of Bohemian Revolt, then it was confiscated to Adam Chval Kunáš of Machovice. In 1623, it was sold to the royal city of České Budějovice, which was the owner of Dubné until the abolition of serfdom.

Since 1850, Dubné is an independent municipality, the other villages were joined in 1961, including Branišov, which became a separate municipality in 1994.

References

Villages in České Budějovice District